Nizam of Hyderabad were monarchs of the Hyderabad State (1724–1948).

Nizam or Nezam may also refer to:

Government
 Nizam (title), a title for sovereigns of Indian states
 Nizām Shahi dynasty of Ahmadnagar Sultanate, India
 Nizam-ı Cedid, set of reforms carried out in the Ottoman Empire
 Nizam-e-Adl Regulation 2009, a government act establishing Sharia law in Malakand, Pakistan

Organizations
 Nizam Club, a gentlemen's club in Hyderabad
 Nizam-e-Islam Party, a political party in Bangladesh
 Milli Nizam Partisi, also known as National Order Party in Turkey

Places
 Chah Nizam Walla, a village in Pakistan
 Nezam Dherma Khel, a town in Pakistan
 Nizamabad, Telangana
 Nizamabad district, a district in Telangana, India

Education
 Nizam College, Hyderabad
 Nizam's Institute of Medical Sciences, Hyderabad
 Nizamiyya, institutes of higher education in Iran
 Jamia Nizamia, a seminary in Hyderabad

Transportation
 Chak Nizam railway station, Pakistan
 Nizam Sama Halt railway station, Pakistan
 Nizam's Guaranteed State Railway, Hyderabad State
 O R Nizam Road, a major road in Chittagong, Bangladesh
 Rover Nizam, a car model

Military
 HMAS Nizam (G38), a Royal Australian Naval vessel
 Nizam's Contingent, the army funded by the Nizam of Hyderabad
 Nizam-ı Cedid Army, established by the Nizam-ı Cedid reforms

Other
 Amir Nezam House, a historic building in Tabriz, Iran
 Nizam (name), a given and surname
 Nazim Jihad, former home of Osama bin Laden

Named after Nizams of Hyderabad
 Nizam Diamond, a diamond of the 19th century
 Jewels of The Nizams, a jewel collection of the Nizams of Hyderabad State, now in Delhi, India.
 Nizam Gate, the main gate to the Sufi shrine of Moinuddin Chishti at Dargah Sharif
 Nizam Sagar, a dam in Nizamabad, Telangana
 Nizam Sugar Factory, in Nizamabad, Telangana
 Nizam's Museum, a museum located in Hyderabad
 Nizam's Rubath, accommodation in Mecca donated by Nizams for the pilgrims coming from Hyderabad

See also
 Nizam al-Din (disambiguation)
 Nizami (disambiguation)
 Nizam-ul-Mulk (disambiguation)